The Umtamvuna Nature Reserve is situated in South Africa on the KwaZulu-Natal side of the Mtamvuna River, and is managed by Ezemvelo KZN Wildlife. The reserve is 3,257 hectares in extent and was established on 25 July 1971.

Description
The reserve includes a section of the Mtamvuna River, and surrounding cliffs and plateaus, from the outskirts of the town of Port Edward to 19 km inland. The total river frontage in the reserve is about 28 km. The reserve also includes the Bulolo River; a tributary of the Mtamvuna. The reserve's 14 km nature trail is suitable for adept and well-prepared hikers.

The plateau areas consist of grasslands (Pondoland Sourveld), which drop off into Coastal Scarp Forest in the gorge along the river below. Some of the cliff-faces are up to 240 m high, and a colony of Cape vultures is said to nest on them. The cliffs were formed by the river incising into Natal Group Sandstone, and many endemic plants grow on this substrate and the soils derived from it. The grassland areas of the reserve are known for their natural display of wildflowers in late spring, depending on rainfall and burns.

Wildlife
Animals in the reserve include

See also
 Forests of KwaZulu-Natal

References

KwaZulu-Natal South Coast
Ezemvelo KZN Wildlife Parks
Nature reserves in South Africa